Acetogenesis is a process through which acetate is produced either by the reduction of CO2 or by the reduction of organic acids, rather than by the oxidative breakdown of carbohydrates or ethanol, as with acetic acid bacteria.

The different bacterial species that are capable of acetogenesis are collectively termed acetogens. Reduction of CO2 to acetate by anaerobic bacteria occurs via the Wood–Ljungdahl pathway and requires an electron source (e.g., H2, CO, formate, etc.). Some acetogens can synthesize acetate autotrophically from carbon dioxide and hydrogen gas. Reduction of organic acids to acetate by anaerobic bacteria occurs via fermentation.

Discovery  
In 1932, organisms were discovered that could convert hydrogen gas and carbon dioxide into acetic acid. The first acetogenic bacterium species,  Clostridium aceticum, was discovered in 1936 by Klaas Tammo Wieringa. A second species, Moorella thermoacetica, attracted wide interest because of its ability, reported in 1942, to convert glucose into three moles of acetic acid.

Biochemistry
The precursor to acetic acid is the thioester acetyl CoA. The key aspects of the acetogenic pathway are several reactions that include the reduction of carbon dioxide to carbon monoxide and the attachment of the carbon monoxide to a methyl group. The first process is catalyzed by enzymes called carbon monoxide dehydrogenase. The coupling of the methyl group (provided by methylcobalamin) and the CO is catalyzed by acetyl CoA synthase.  
2 CO2 + 4 H2  →  CH3COOH + 2H2O

Applications 
The unique metabolism of acetogens has significance in biotechnological uses. In carbohydrate fermentations, the decarboxylation reactions involved result in the loss of carbon into carbon dioxide. This loss is an issue with an increased requirement of minimization of CO2 emissions, as well as successful competition for fossil fuels with biofuel production being limited by monetary value. Acetogens can ferment glucose without any CO2  emissions and convert it to 3 acetates, which can theoretically increase product yield by 50%. Acetogenesis does not replace glycolysis with a different pathway, but is rather used by capturing CO2 from glycolysis and placing it through acetogenesis.

References   

Anaerobic digestion
Hydrogen biology